The Winthrop Eagles are the intercollegiate athletics teams that represent Winthrop University, located in Rock Hill, South Carolina. Winthrop's 17 men's and women's teams compete at the National Collegiate Athletic Association (NCAA) Division I level as a member of the Big South Conference.

NCAA Championships 
Winthrop University has two team national championships awarded by the NCAA. 

Esports
2021 League of Legends National 
Champions
2021 Rocket League National Champions

History 
Winthrop University was founded in 1886, but the school didn't become an NCAA Division I institution until 1987. It joined the Big South conference in 1983, the year the conference was established.

Many student athletes from WU have gone on to play professionally in the United States or abroad after their collegiate careers. A few of these figures include: Marco Reda (soccer), Kevin Slowey (baseball), Pam Barnett (golf), Xavier Cooks (basketball), and Michael Jenkins (basketball).

Teams

Baseball 

 Big South Tournament Championships (4): 1985, 1987, 1999, 2005
 Big South Regular Season Championships (5): 1995, 2001, 2014, 2017

Softball 

 Big South Tournament Championships (6): 1987, 1989, 1990, 1991, 2007, 2008
 Big South Regular Season Championships (6): 1988, 1989, 1991, 2005, 2007, 2008

Men's Basketball 

 Big South Tournament Championships (13): 1988, 1999, 2000, 2001, 2002, 2005, 2006, 2007, 2008, 2010, 2017, 2020, 2021
 Big South Regular Season Championships (11): 1999, 2002, 2003, 2005, 2006, 2007, 2008, 2016, 2017, 2020, 2021

Women's Basketball 

 Big South Tournament Championships (1): 2014

Men's Cross Country 

 Big South Championships (2): 1999, 2000

Women's Cross Country 

 Big South Championships (0):

Esports 

 Big South Championships (0):

Women's Golf 

 Big South Championships (3): 1989, 1990, 1991

Men's Soccer 

 Big South Tournament Championships (6): 2002, 2006, 2008, 2009, 2012, 2015
 Big South Regular Season Championships (5): 1987, 2002, 2006, 2008, 2015

Women's Soccer 

 Big South Tournament Championships (0):
 Big South Regular Season Championships (3): 2006, 2010, 2011

Men's Tennis 

 Big South Tournament Championships (7): 1997, 2004, 2005, 2006, 2010, 2014, 2015
 Big South Regular Season Championships (9): 1997, 2002, 2003, 2004, 2005, 2007, 2010, 2011, 2018

Women's Tennis 

 Big South Tournament Championships (20): 1994, 1995, 1996, 1999, 2000, 2002, 2003, 2004, 2005, 2006, 2008, 2009, 2010, 2011, 2012, 2013, 2014, 2016, 2017, 2018
 Big South Regular Season Championships (19): 1994, 1995, 1996, 1999, 2000, 2002, 2003, 2004, 2005, 2006, 2007, 2008, 2009, 2011, 2012, 2013, 2016, 2017, 2018

Men's Track and Field 

 Big South Tournament Championships (0):
 Big South Regular Season Championships (0):

Women's Track and Field 

 Big South Tournament Championships (0):
 Big South Regular Season Championships (0):

Women's Lacrosse 

 Big South Tournament Championships (2): 2015, 2016
 Big South Regular Season Championships (2): 2015, 2016

Women's Volleyball 

 Big South Tournament Championships (6): 2002, 2003, 2004, 2005, 2006, 2019
 Big South Regular Season Championships (7): 1988, 2004, 2005, 2006, 2007, 2011, 2019

Miscellaneous 
Mascot: Big Stuff (and Little Stuff)

Chant: “Rock the Hill”

Outfitter: Adidas

Official craft brewery: Full Spectrum Brewing Company

Rivalries: UNC Asheville, Coastal Carolina

Radio network: 94.3 FM and 104.1 The Bridge

NCAA statistical leaders 
In the 2006–07 season, James Shuler (men's basketball) led the nation in highest single game free-throw percentage (100%, 18/18).

In the 2007–08 season, Michael Jenkins (men's basketball) led the nation in most three-point field goals made in a single game (12).

In the 2012–13 season, Diana Choibekova (women's basketball) led the nation in three-point field goal average (3.9 per game).

In the 2018–19 season, the men's basketball team led the nation in three-point field goals per game (12.4).

In the 2019–20 season, Chase Claxton (men's basketball) shot 81.2% to lead the nation in two-point shooting average.

In the 2019–20 season, the men's basketball team had 1388 rebounds to lead the nation in total rebounds.

In the 2020–21 season, Chandler Vaudrin (men's basketball) led the nation in triple-doubles at 3 in total.

Olympics

References

External links